Montgomery County is a county located in the Valley and Ridge area of the U.S. state of Virginia. As population in the area increased, Montgomery County was formed in 1777 from Fincastle County, which in turn had been taken from Botetourt County.  As of the 2020 census, the population was 99,721. Its county seat is Christiansburg, and Blacksburg is the largest town. Montgomery County is part of the Blacksburg-Christiansburg metropolitan area. It is dominated economically by the presence of Virginia Tech, Virginia's third largest public university, which is the county's largest employer.

Board of Supervisors 
The Montgomery County Board of Supervisors sets the annual budget and tax rates, enacts legislation governing the county and its citizens, sets policies and oversees their implementation. There are seven supervisors; one is elected from each of the seven geographic districts. Terms are four years; three or four seats are up for re-election each odd year.

History
Montgomery County was established on December 31, 1776, made from parts of Fincastle County, which was disbanded at this time and split into Montgomery, Washington, and Kentucky counties.  Later, Montgomery lost land to form counties which now border it, including some counties which later formed West Virginia.

The county is named for Richard Montgomery, an American Revolutionary War general killed in 1775 while attempting to capture Quebec City, Canada.

Geography
The western part of the county is in the New River watershed.

Adjacent counties and city
 Craig County - Northeast
 Giles County - Northwest
 City of Radford - West
 Pulaski County - Southwest
 Floyd County - South
 Roanoke County - East

National protected area
 Jefferson National Forest (part)

Major highways

U.S. Bicycle Route
  enters Montgomery County from Radford and crosses the county for 27.9 miles to Roanoke County

Demographics

2020 census

Note: the US Census treats Hispanic/Latino as an ethnic category. This table excludes Latinos from the racial categories and assigns them to a separate category. Hispanics/Latinos can be of any race.

As of the 2020 United States Census, there were 99,721 people living in the county. The population density was 257.8 people per square mile (99.5/km2).

2010 Census
As of the 2010 United States Census, there were 94,392 people living in the county. 87.6% were White, 5.4% Asian, 3.9% Black or African American, 0.2% Native American, 0.8% of some other race and 2.1% of two or more races. 2.7% were Hispanic or Latino (of any race).

2000 Census
As of the 2000 United States Census, there were 83,629 people, 30,997 households, and 17,203 families living in the county. The population density was 215 people per square mile (83/km2). There were 32,527 housing units at an average density of 84 per square mile (32/km2). The racial makeup of the county was 90.00% White, 3.97% Asian, 3.65% Black or African American, 0.18% Native American, 0.04% Pacific Islander, 0.63% from other races, and 1.53% from two or more races. 1.58% of the population were Hispanic or Latino of any race.

There were 30,997 households, out of which 25.30% had children under the age of 18 living with them, 44.80% were married couples living together, 7.60% had a female householder with no husband present, and 44.50% were non-families. 25.50% of all households were made up of individuals, and 6.60% had someone living alone who was 65 years of age or older. The average household size was 2.40 and the average family size was 2.87.

In the county, the population was spread out, with 17.10% under the age of 18, 31.30% from 18 to 24, 25.60% from 25 to 44, 17.30% from 45 to 64, and 8.60% who were 65 years of age or older. The median age was 26 years. For every 100 females, there were 110.00 males. For every 100 females age 18 and over, there were 110.90 males.

The median income for a household in the county was $32,330, and the median income for a family was $47,239. Males had a median income of $33,674 versus $23,555 for females. The per capita income for the county was $17,077. About 8.80% of families and 23.20% of the population were below the poverty line, including 14.60% of those under age 18 and 8.80% of those age 65 or over.

Politics
Despite being in the Solid South, Montgomery County did not consistently back Democratic candidates in the early 20th century, being a swing county from 1900 to 1940. From 1944 to 1988, the county was consistently Republican, though the presence of a major university in Virginia Tech helped make the county more competitive to the Democratic Party towards the end of that streak. It has since become a bellwether county, backing the national winner in every election from 1980 to 2008. The county backed the losing candidate, by very narrow margins of 103 votes in 2012 and 562 votes in 2016 (although this time backing the majority candidate), but again backed the winning candidate in 2020. 2020 was the first time since 1980 that the county voted more Democratic than the nation.

Climate

Education

Colleges and universities 
 Virginia Polytechnic Institute and State University (Virginia Tech)
 Via College of Osteopathic Medicine
 New River Community College

Public High schools 
 Blacksburg High School
 Christiansburg High School
 Auburn High School
 Eastern Montgomery High School

Private High schools 
 Pathway Christian Academy
 Dayspring Christian Academy

Communities

Towns 
 Blacksburg
 Christiansburg

Census-designated places 

 Belview
 Elliston
 Lafayette
 Merrimac
 Plum Creek
 Prices Fork
 Riner
 Shawsville

Other unincorporated communities 

 Alleghany Springs
 Bradshaw
 Belmont
 Childress
 Ellett
 Graysontown
 Ironto
 Long Shop
 Lusters Gate
 McCoy
 McDonalds Mill
 New Ellett
 Pilot
 Rogers
 Sowers
 Sugar Grove
 Toms Creek
 Vicker
 Walton
 Yellow Sulphur Springs

See also
 National Register of Historic Places listings in Montgomery County, Virginia

References

 
Virginia counties
1772 establishments in Virginia
Blacksburg–Christiansburg metropolitan area
Counties of Appalachia